Lower Válicka  is a stream in Zala County, Hungary. It originates at Válickapuszta, Pusztaszentlászló, near the Upper Válicka. It ends at Páka, where it flows to Cserta.

See also 
 Upper Válicka

Geography of Zala County
Rivers of Hungary